James Theobald may also refer to:

James Theobald (politician) (1829-1894)
James Theobald (natural historian) (1688-1759)